Legacy of Kings is the second album created by the Swedish heavy metal band HammerFall. It was released on 28 September 1998 by Nuclear Blast.The enhanced CD release includes the music video for the track "Let the Hammer Fall", a photo gallery, lyrics for the songs, PC wallpapers, a screensaver, and a Winamp skin only on the Bonus Deluxe Edition.

In 2019, Metal Hammer ranked it as the 9th best power metal album of all time.

Track listing

Regional differences 
 In 2001 a Russian version was released with the following bonus tracks

 Legacy of Kings Box (limited box which contains CD of Legacy of Kings, personalized pick, Heeding The Call sticker and signed cards of each member.), LP, Shape CD (Sun-Shaped), Picture LP, Value Box (With "Always Will Be" CDS) and Deluxe Edition.
 All versions contain the songs from #1 to #10, excepted the ones listed below.
 The Japanese release contains "Eternal Dark", Stone Cold" and "Steel Meets Steel" as bonus tracks, plus the enhanced part.
 The Brazilian release contains "I Want Out" as bonus track.
 Deluxe Edition contains "The Metal Age" and "Steel Meets Steel" (both recorded live) as bonus tracks.

There is a limited version that includes all four tracks from the "Always Will Be" single as bonus tracks.
There is also a re-release of the album which contains a videoclip for "Let the Hammer Fall", and two additional live tracks: "The Metal Age" and "Steel Meets Steel".

Chart positions

Credits

HammerFall
 Joacim Cans - lead vocals
 Oscar Dronjak - guitar, backing vocals
 Stefan Elmgren - lead guitar
 Magnus Rosén - bass
 Patrik Räfling - drums

Other Personnel
Andreas Marschall - cover art
Flea Black - artwork
Fredrik Nordström - engineering and mixing
Göran Finnberg - mastering
Mikael Johansson - photography

References

External links 
 Album information
 Lyrics at Darklyrics

1998 albums
HammerFall albums
Nuclear Blast albums
Albums recorded at Studio Fredman
Albums produced by Fredrik Nordström